The Butterfly LLC was an American aircraft manufacturer specializing in homebuilt gyroplanes. Complete gyroplane kits were offered for the homebuilt market, as well as completed aircraft marketed for law enforcement surveillance. "The" was prefixed to the name of products.

The company seems to have gone out of business at the beginning of 2015.

Aircraft

References

External links
Company website archives on Archive.org

Defunct aircraft manufacturers of the United States
Homebuilt aircraft
Autogyros